Abram Solomonovich Gurvich (Russian Абра́м Соломо́нович Гу́рвич) was a Russian composer of chess endgame studies. He was born in Baku on February 11, 1897, worked as literature and theatrical reviewer. His first chess study was published in 1926. Gurvich composed more than 100 endgame studies. Died in Moscow on November 18, 1962. At the end of the 1940s he was one of the main targets of the so-called campaign against the "rootless cosmopolitans".

A study by Abram Gurvich

Solution:

1. Nb6-d7 Bc7! 
 (1…Bf4 2. Kg4 and 3. Kf5; if 1… Ba7, then 2. Ne5! Kg7 3. Bb2!)
2. Nd7-f8 Bc7-e5! 
3. Kh3-g4! Be5-b2! 
4. Ba3-c5! Bb2-d4! 
5. g6-g7!! K:g7 (5... B:g7 6. Be3 mate)
6. Nf8-e6+

Works
 Этюды (Chess Studies, Russian), Moscow, 1961.

External links
 From Anti-Westernism to Anti-Semitism
 About one anti-patriotic group of theatre critics (from "Pravda", 28 January 1949)

1897 births
1962 deaths
Chess composers
Soviet literary historians
Soviet male writers
20th-century male writers
20th-century chess players